Sarah Fisher (born 1980) is an American racecar driver.

Sarah Fisher or Sara Fisher may also refer to:

 Sarah Egerton (actress), née Fisher (1782–1847), English actress
 Sarah Fisher, Canadian actress known for Degrassi: The Next Generation
 Sara Fisher, founder of 12 Peers Theater
 Sara Fisher, a character from "The Fifth Man" episode of Numb3rs
 Sara Fisher, a character from The Passage
 Sarah Fisher, a character from Tom Clancy's Splinter Cell